The following is a list of deaths in June 2009.

Entries for each day are listed alphabetically by surname. A typical entry lists information in the following sequence:
Name, age, country of citizenship at birth, subsequent country of citizenship (if applicable), what subject was known for, cause of death (if known), and reference.

June 2009

1
Thomas Berry, 94, American cultural historian and ecotheologian.
Bob Christie, 85, American racing driver.
Ken Clark, 81, American actor, heart attack.
Ernest R. May, 80, American historian (Harvard University), complications from cancer surgery.
Vincent O'Brien, 92, Irish race horse trainer.
Alexander S. Potupa, 64, Belarusian politician, physicist, economist and writer.
Jerry Rosenberg, 72, American jailhouse lawyer, natural causes.
Parvin Soleimani, 86, Persian actress, brain tumor.
Dirk du Toit, 65, South African politician, suspected heart failure.
Notable people that died in the crash of Air France Flight 447:
 Silvio Barbato, 50, Italian-born Brazilian conductor and composer.
 Giambattista Lenzi, 58, Italian politician.
 Fatma Ceren Necipoğlu, 37, Turkish classical harpist and academic (Anadolu University in Eskişehir).
 Prince Pedro Luiz of Orléans-Braganza, 26, Brazilian prince.

2
William Booth, 70, Irish Anglican priest, Deputy Clerk of the Closet (1991–2007).
Kai Lai Chung, 92, Chinese-born American mathematician.
David Eddings, 77, American fantasy author.
John Ernsting, 81, British Air Vice-Marshal, expert in aviation medicine.
FrancEyE, 87, American poet, complications from a hip fracture.
Terry Hankins, 34, American serial killer, execution by lethal injection.
Alfred Kern, 85, American novelist and academic.
Tony Maggs, 72, South African racing driver, cancer.
Palghat R. Raghu, 81, Burmese-born Indian musician, cardiac arrest.
Kidane-Mariam Teklehaimanot, 75, Ethiopian Roman Catholic prelate, Bishop of Adigrat (1985–2001).
Paul O. Williams, 74, American science fiction author, aortic dissection.

3
Geoffrey Bingham, 90, Australian evangelical Christian writer.
David Bromige, 75, British-born Canadian poet and academic, winner of the Pushcart Prize, complications from diabetes.
Sam Butera, 81, American saxophonist, Alzheimer's disease.
James F. Calvert, 88, American naval officer, 46th Superintendent of the U.S. Naval Academy, heart failure.
David Carradine, 72, American actor (Kung Fu, Kill Bill, Boxcar Bertha) and film director, erotic asphyxiation.
*Do Kum-bong, 79, South Korean actress.
Sam George, 56, Canadian activist, native rights campaigner who advocated for the Ipperwash Inquiry following the Ipperwash Crisis, pancreatic and lung cancer.
Thomas Gill, 87, American politician, U.S. Representative from Hawaii (1963–1965), after long illness.
Frank G. Harrison, 69, American politician, U.S. Representative from Pennsylvania (1983–1985), natural causes.
Geir Høgsnes, 58, Norwegian sociologist.
Peter J. Landin, 78, British computer scientist, prostate cancer.
John Campbell Ross, 110, Australian supercentenarian, last surviving Australian veteran of World War I.
*Shih Kien, 96, Hong Kong actor (Enter the Dragon).
Koko Taylor, 80, American blues musician, complications from gastrointestinal surgery.
Moloko Temo, 134?, South African centenarian, claimant to the world's oldest person title.

4
Mojisola Adekunle-Obasanjo, 65, Nigerian army officer and politician.
Lev Brovarskyi, 60, Ukrainian Soviet-era footballer and coach.
Robert Colescott, 83, American painter, U.S. representative to Venice Biennale (1997).
Ward Costello, 89, American actor and composer, complications from a stroke.
Philip D. Curtin, 87, American historian, pneumonia.
Luc Alfons de Hovre, 83, Belgian Roman Catholic prelate, Auxiliary Bishop Emeritus of Mechelen-Brussels (1982–2002).
John F. Henning, 93, American politician and diplomat, United States Ambassador to New Zealand (1967–1969).
Dorothy Layton, 96, American actress (County Hospital).
Chris O'Brien, 57, Australian oncologist, surgeon on the reality television program RPA, brain tumour.
Randy Smith, 60, American basketball player (Buffalo Braves), 1978 NBA All-Star Game MVP, heart attack.

5
Bernard Barker, 92, Cuban-born American intelligence operative, Watergate burglar, lung cancer.
Peter L. Bernstein, 90, American economic historian, pneumonia.
Alan Berkman, 63, American physician and activist, lymphoma.
Fleur Cowles, 101, American writer, editor and artist.
Baciro Dabó, 51, Guinea-Bissauan politician, presidential candidate, shot.
Jeff Hanson, 31, American singer–songwriter, mixed drug toxicity.
Ola Hudson, 62, American fashion designer and costumier, cancer.
Richard Jacobs, 83, American real estate developer, owner of the Cleveland Indians (1986–2001), after long illness.
*Luo Jing, 48, Chinese news presenter, lymphoma.
Adilgerei Magomedtagirov, 53, Russian general, Interior Minister for the Republic of Dagestan, shot.
Rajeev Motwani, 47, Indian-born American academic, advisor for Google, Inc.
Boris Pokrovsky, 97, Russian opera director, People's Artist of the USSR.
Helder Proença, Guinea-Bissauan politician, Minister of Defense, shot.
Haydn Tanner, 92, British rugby union player.
George Edward Wahlen, 84, American soldier, Medal of Honor recipient, after long illness.

6
Charles Arnold-Baker, 90, British historian.
Jean Dausset, 92, French immunologist, Nobel Prize in Medicine (1980).
Mary Howard de Liagre, 96, American actress (Abe Lincoln in Illinois, Swamp Water).
Jim Owens, 82, American college football coach (Washington Huskies), complications from hypertension and heart problems.
Pio Sagapolutele, 39, American Samoan footballer (Cleveland Browns, New England Patriots), aneurysm.

7
Roy Boe, 79, American businessman, owner of New Jersey Nets (1969–1978), New York Islanders (1972–1979), heart failure.
Hugh Hopper, 64, British progressive rock bassist and composer (Soft Machine), leukaemia.
Willie Kilmarnock, 87, Scottish footballer (Motherwell F.C.).
Gordon Lennon, 26, Northern Irish footballer (Dumbarton F.C.), car crash.
Kenny Rankin, 69, American singer-songwriter, lung cancer.
Peter Townsend, 81, British sociologist, pneumonia.
Baron Vaea, 88, Tongan politician, Prime Minister (1991–2000), after short illness.

8
Om Prakash Aditya, 72, Indian poet, car accident.
Omar Bongo, 73, Gabonese politician, President (1967–2009), heart attack.
Frank Dasso, 91, American baseball player.
Sheila Finestone, 82, Canadian politician, MP for Mount Royal (1984–1999) and Senator (1999–2002), cancer.
Aage Rou Jensen, 84, Danish footballer.
Harold Norse, 92, American poet.
Johnny Palermo, 27, American actor (Everybody Hates Chris), car accident.
Matt Simpson, 73, British poet and literary critic.
Habib Tanvir, 85, Indian playwright and theatre director, after short illness.

9
Duke Bainum, 56, American politician (Hawaii House of Representatives, Honolulu City Council), aortic aneurysm.
Norman E. Brinker, 78, American restaurateur (Brinker International), aspiration pneumonia.
Cyril Connell, Jr., 81, Australian rugby league player.
Edward Hanrahan, 88, American lawyer, State's Attorney (Cook County, Illinois), leukemia.
Jean Hugel, 84, French winemaker (Alsace wine), cancer.
Bill Lillard, 90, American baseball player (Philadelphia Athletics).
Jack Littrell, 80, American baseball player, Alzheimer's disease.
Dick May, 78, American racing driver, after long illness.
John Francis Mitchell, 81, American electronics engineer, president of Motorola.
Vera Mutafchieva, 80, Bulgarian historian.
Michael Roof, 32, American actor (xXx, Black Hawk Down, The Dukes of Hazzard), suicide by hanging.
Dave Simons, 54, American comic book artist, cancer.
Arne Tovik, 53, Norwegian newspaper editor and journalist.
Karl Michael Vogler, 80, German actor.

10
Barry Beckett, 66, American record producer, session musician, keyboardist (Muscle Shoals Rhythm Section), natural causes.
Andrew Wendell Bogue, 90, American federal judge.
John A. Eddy, 78, American astronomer, cancer.
Tenniel Evans, 83, British actor.
Xaver Frick, 96, Liechtensteinian Olympic athlete and cross-country skier.
Aza Gazgireyeva, Russian jurist, senior judge in Ingushetia, shot.
Huey Long, 105, American singer (The Ink Spots).
Michel Nguyên Khác Ngu, 100, Vietnamese Roman Catholic prelate, bishop of Long Xuyên (1960–1997).
Jack Nimitz, 79, American jazz baritone saxophonist, complications from emphysema.
Marian Pour-El, 81, American mathematical logician.
Richard Quick, 66, American swimming and diving coach, brain tumor.
Stelios Skevofilakas, 70, Greek footballer (AEK Athens), stomach cancer.
Helle Virkner, 83, Danish actress and first lady, cancer.

11
Viacheslav Aliabiev, 75, Ukrainian footballer (Shakhtyor Stalino), USSR Cup winner (1961, 1962), cancer.
Sidney W. Bijou, 100, American child psychologist.
Marian Goliński, 59, Polish politician, car accident.
Woodie Held, 77, American baseball player (Cleveland Indians), brain cancer.
Jakob Kjersem, 83, Norwegian Olympic athlete.
Frank J. Low, 75, American physicist and astronomer.
Christel Peters, 93, German actress.
Carl Pursell, 76, American politician, U.S. Representative from Michigan (1977–1993), heart disease.
Ricardo Rangel, 85, Mozambican photojournalist.
Sumire, 21, Japanese fashion model, brain hemorrhage.
Roger Terry, 87, American airman (Tuskegee Airmen), heart failure.
Peter Wheeler, 65, British chemical engineer and businessman, owner of TVR, after short illness.

12
Shailaja Acharya, 65, Nepalese politician, Deputy Prime Minister (1998), Alzheimer's disease and pneumonia.
Annesley Dias, Sri Lankan comedian,
Robinson O. Everett, 81, American judge, member of the Court of Appeals for the Armed Forces since 1980.
Charles Fenton, 97, Australian politician, member (1957–1981) and President (1972–1981) of the Tasmanian Legislative Council.
Peter Gowan, 63, British professor of politics, mesothelioma.
Andy Hughes, 43, British musician (The Orb), producer and DJ.
Ivan Lichter, 91, New Zealand physician, pioneer in palliative care.
Félix Malloum, 76, Chadian politician, President (1975–1979), cardiac arrest.
Rosa Markmann, 101, Chilean First Lady (1946–1952).

13
Bashir Aushev, 62, Russian public official, Deputy Prime Minister of Ingushetia (2002–2008), shot.
Otilio Galíndez, 73, Venezuelan poet and composer.
Mitsuharu Misawa, 46, Japanese professional wrestler, spinal cord injury.
John Saville, 93, British Marxist economic and social historian.

14
Khalil Abi-Nader, 87, Lebanese Maronite prelate, archbishop of Beirut (1986–1996).
Bob Bogle, 69, American guitarist (The Ventures), non-Hodgkin lymphoma.
Angela Coughlan, 56, Canadian swimmer, bronze medalist (1968 Summer Olympics), multiple myeloma.
*Ivan Della Mea, 68, Italian singer–songwriter and author, after long illness.
Yasuharu Hasebe, 77, Japanese film director, pneumonia.
Dorothy Kozak, 77, Canadian Olympic sprinter.
William McIntyre, 91, Canadian jurist, Puisne Justice of the Supreme Court of Canada (1979–1989), throat cancer.
*Moumouni Adamou Djermakoye, 70, Nigerien  politician.
Carlos Pardo, 33, Mexican NASCAR race driver, race crash.
Edith Ronne, 89, American explorer, first American woman to visit Antarctica, cancer.
Frederick Sontag, 84, American academic and author, professor of philosophy (Pomona College), heart failure.
Abel Tador, 24, Nigerian footballer, shot.
Hal Woodeshick, 76, American baseball player (Houston Colt .45s), after long illness.

15
Sohrab Aarabi, 19, Iranian student, shot.
George Belotti, 74, American football player, complications of a stroke.
Antonio Bianco, 57, South African diamond cutter, cancer.
Helen Boosalis, 89, American politician, Mayor of Lincoln, Nebraska (1975–1983), brain tumor.
Charles Horan, 85, British police officer.
Allan King, 79, Canadian film director (Warrendale, Termini Station, Silence of the North), brain tumor.
Desmond Moran, 60, Australian criminal, member of Moran family, shot.

16
John Anthony, 76, British Olympic shooter.
Peter Arundell, 75, British racing driver, pulmonary fibrosis.
Douglas Bunn, 81, British barrister and horse breeder, founder and chairman of the All England Jumping Course.
Emmanuel Constant, 81, Haitian Roman Catholic prelate, Bishop of Les Gonaïves (1966–2003).
Paul A. Fino, 95, American politician, U.S. Representative from New York (1953–1968).
Celia Fremlin, 95, British crime novelist.
D. Mark Hegsted, 95, American nutritionist, research led to recommended decrease in dietary saturated fats.
Charlie Mariano, 85, American jazz alto saxophonist, cancer.
Tina Marsh, 55, American jazz vocalist, breast cancer.
Frank Herbert Mason, 88, American artist and teacher.
Proud Accolade, 7, American Thoroughbred racehorse, neurological disorder.
Sheila Rodwell, 62, British epidemiologist.

17
Joji Banuve, 68/9, Fijian politician, Minister for Local Government and the Environment, after short illness.
José Calvário, 58, Portuguese maestro and orchestrator, complications from heart attack.
Ralf Dahrendorf, Baron Dahrendorf, 80, German-born British sociologist and politician, cancer.
Alejandro Doria, 72, Argentine film director, pneumonia.
Patrick Dowling, 89, British television producer.
Eon, 55, British musician, complications from pneumonia.
*José Ignacio García Hamilton, 65, Argentine politician and historian.
Jane Aiken Hodge, 91, American-born British writer, suicide by drug overdose.
Wayne L. Horvitz, 88, American labor mediator, cancer.
John Houghtaling, 92, American businessman and inventor (Magic Fingers vibrating bed), complications from a fall.
IZ the Wiz, 50, American graffiti artist, heart attack.
Darrell Powers, 86, American soldier, served in the 506th Infantry Regiment (Band of Brothers), natural causes.
Dusty Rhodes, 82, American baseball player (New York Giants), complications from diabetes and emphysema.
Ali Said, Somali public servant, chief of police (Mogadishu), shot.
Perry Salles, 70, Brazilian actor (Mandala, Cinderela Baiana, O Clone) and film director, lung cancer.
Shacky Tauro, 49, Zimbabwean footballer, after short illness.
Tony Wong, 60, Canadian politician.
Gordon Wray, 57, British-born Canadian politician.

18
Omar Hashi Aden, Somali politician, Minister of Security, suicide bomb attack.
Giovanni Arrighi, 71, Italian economist.
Hortensia Bussi, 94, Chilean First Lady (1970–1973), widow of President Salvador Allende, natural causes.
Victor Cosson, 93, French road bicycle racer.
Terry Griffiths, 64, Australian politician.
Sir Henry Hodge, 65, British jurist, High Court judge since 2004, acute myeloid leukaemia.
Ali Akbar Khan, 87, Indian sarod player, kidney failure.

19
Alberto Andrade, 65, Peruvian politician, pulmonary fibrosis.
Sir Derrick Bailey, 90, British cricketer and baronet, son of diamond tycoon and politician Sir Abe Bailey.
H. A. Boucher, 88, American politician, first elected Lieutenant Governor of Alaska (1970–1974).
Ron Crocombe, 79, New Zealand academic (University of the South Pacific), heart attack.
Vicenç Ferrer Moncho, 89, Spanish Jesuit missionary and philanthropist.
Shelly Gross, 88, American Broadway producer, bladder cancer.
Jörg Hube, 65, German actor, cancer.
Arthur W. Lehman, 91, American euphonium player, pulmonary fibrosis.
Peter Newbrook, 88, British cinematographer and film producer.
Gary Papa, 54, American television sportscaster (WPVI-TV), prostate cancer.
Ken Roberts, 99, American actor and announcer, pneumonia.
Herschel Rosenthal, 91, American politician, member of the California Senate (1982–1998).
Bob Schuler, 66, American politician, member of the Ohio Senate since 2002, cancer.
Stan Sismey, 92, Australian cricketer.
Tomoji Tanabe, 113, Japanese supercentenarian, was world's oldest living man, heart failure.

20
Colin Bean, 83, British actor (Dad's Army).
Aldo Gargani, 76, Italian philosopher.
Joel Helleny, 52, American trombonist,
Ralph F. Hirschmann, 87, American biochemist (synthesis of the first enzyme), renal failure.
Nazir Jairazbhoy, 81, British-born American ethnomusicologist.
Naci Kınacıoğlu, 79/80, Turkish academician, legal scholar, interim Minister of Transport.
Patrick Kombayi, 70, Zimbabwean politician and businessman, complications from 1990 shooting.
Godfrey Rampling, 100, British athlete, 1936 Olympic relay champion, NATO commander, father of actress Charlotte Rampling.
Kenneth L. Reusser, 89, American Marine aviator, decorated veteran of World War II, Korean and Vietnam Wars.
Anthony Yeo, 60, Singaporean counsellor, Burkitt's lymphoma.

21
Gilda Galán, 92, Puerto Rican actress.
Lorena Gale, 51, Canadian actress (Battlestar Galactica, The Perfect Score) and playwright, throat cancer.
José Nicomedes Grossi, 93, Brazilian Roman Catholic prelate, Bishop of Bom Jesus da Lapa (1962–1990).
Errol Harris, 101, South African philosopher.
Arthur Luft, 94, Manx politician and deemster.

22
Agnes Tachyon, 11, Japanese Thoroughbred racehorse, heart failure.
Betty Allen, 82, American operatic mezzo-soprano, kidney disease.
Bert Bank, 94, American radio pioneer and politician, Bataan Death March survivor.
Antonio Fernandes de Castro, 111, Portuguese supercentenarian.
David Farquhar, 82, Australian politician, member of the Tasmanian House of Assembly (1972–1976).
Alec Gallup, 81, American pollster, chairman of the Gallup Poll, heart disease.
June Gordon, Marchioness of Aberdeen and Temair, 95, British musician and patron of the arts.
Maj-Len Grönholm, 57, Finnish politician and beauty queen, councilwoman, Miss Finland (1972), cancer.
Moisei Itkis, 80, Soviet Olympic shooter.
Billy Red Lyons, 77, Canadian professional wrestler, cancer.
Eddie Preston, 84, American jazz trumpeter.
Steve Race, 88, British broadcaster and musician.
Philip Simmons, 97, American blacksmith.
Karel Van Miert, 67, Belgian politician, European Commissioner (1989–1999), cardiac arrest resulting in fall.
Sam B. Williams, 88, American engineer and inventor.

23
Thurman Adams Jr., 80, American politician, member of the Delaware Senate since 1972, pancreatic cancer.
Raymond Berthiaume, 78, Canadian jazz musician, singer and record producer, cancer.
Phyllis Busansky, 72, American politician, county commissioner and supervisor of elections (Hillsborough County, Florida).
John Callaway, 72, American journalist (Chicago Tonight), heart attack.
Harold H. Carstens, 84, American magazine publisher.
Gegham Ghandilyan, 35, Armenian actor, car accident.
İsmet Güney, 85, Cypriot artist and cartoonist, designed flag of the Republic of Cyprus, cancer.
Hanne Hiob, 86, German actress, daughter of poet and playwright Bertolt Brecht.
Johny Joseph, 45, Haitian news presenter (Télévision Nationale d'Haiti), cancer.
Thomas M. King, 80, American Roman Catholic priest and theologian, expert on Pierre Teilhard de Chardin, heart attack.
Ed McMahon, 86, American television host (Star Search) and announcer (The Tonight Show).
Aram Miskaryan, 36, Armenian actor, car accident.
Jerri Nielsen, 57, American physician, treated herself for breast cancer on Antarctica in 1999, breast cancer.
Robin Plackett, 88, British statistician.
Jackie Swindells, 72, British footballer.

24
Irv Homer, 85, American talk show host, heart attack.
Olja Ivanjicki, 78, Serbian painter.
Tim Krekel, 58, American guitarist and songwriter, cancer.
Robèrt Lafont, 87, French academic.
Roméo LeBlanc, 81, Canadian politician (1973–1994), Governor General (1995–1999), Alzheimer's disease.
Robert B. Pamplin, 97, American executive, President of Georgia-Pacific (1957–1976).
Ed Thomas, 58, American football coach, NFL High School Football Coach of the Year (2005), shot.
Steven Wells, 49, British journalist and author, cancer.

25
Ramon Alcaraz, 93, Filipino World War II veteran and recipient of the Silver Star.
Don Coldsmith, 83, American western author, stroke.
Neera Desai, 84, Indian academician, political activist and Women's Studies pioneer.
George Ernest, 87, American film actor.
Farrah Fawcett, 62, American actress (Charlie's Angels), anal cancer.
Morton Gottlieb, 88, American Broadway theatre producer, Tony Award winner (1971), natural causes.
James Baker Hall, 74, American poet and academic, Kentucky Poet Laureate (2001–2003), natural causes.
Michael Jackson, 50, American singer–songwriter and dancer, acute propofol and benzodiazepine intoxication.
Clifton Johnson, 67, American jurist, North Carolina Superior Court (1978–1982) and Court of Appeals (1982–1996).
Jack Johnson, 78, Canadian politician.
Brian Jones, 70, British poet.
Sylvia Levin, 91, American civic and voter registration activist, registered 47,000 new voters, stroke.
Shiv Charan Mathur, 83, Indian politician, Governor of Assam since 2008, Chief Minister of Rajasthan (1988–1989), cardiac arrest.
Mian Tufail Mohammad, 95, Pakistani politician, cerebral hemorrhage.
Bela Mukhopadhyay, 89, Indian singer, widow of singer and composer Hemanta Mukherjee, natural causes.
Paul V. Nolan, 85, American physician and statesman, liver cancer.
Kaleem Omar, 72, Pakistani poet and journalist, heart failure.
Sky Saxon, 71, American rock musician (The Seeds), heart failure.
Hugh Scaife, 79, British set decorator (The Elephant Man, The Spy Who Loved Me, A Passage to India).
Zinaida Stahurskaya, 38, Belarusian cyclist, training collision (car accident).
Al Siebert, 75, American author and educator, colon cancer.
Anil Wilson, 62, Indian educator, Principal of St. Stephen's College, Delhi (1991–2007), pancreatic cancer.
Yasmine, 37, Belgian singer and television presenter, suicide by hanging.

26
Jo Amar, 79, Moroccan-born Israeli singer.
Bernard Ganley, 83, British rugby league player.
Amnon Kapeliouk, 78, Israeli journalist and author.

27
Ernst Barkmann, 89, German World War II Waffen-SS soldier and Panzer ace.
Frank Barlow, 98, British historian.
Victoriano Crémer, 102, Spanish poet and journalist, natural causes.
Mary Lou Forbes, 83, American journalist, Pulitzer Prize winner (1959), breast cancer.
Willy Kyrklund, 88, Finnish-born Swedish author.
Nanae Nagata, 53, Japanese marathon runner, colorectal cancer.
Fayette Pinkney, 61, American musician (The Three Degrees), respiratory failure.
Gale Storm, 87, American actress (My Little Margie, The Gale Storm Show).
Gordon Taylor, 93, British Anglican priest and Royal Navy chaplain.
Jackie Washington, 89, Canadian blues musician, complications from a heart attack.

28
Terry Black, 62, Canadian singer, multiple sclerosis.
Joseph Crowdy, 85, British soldier, Commandant of the Royal Army Medical Corps.
Josep Maria Guix Ferreres, 81, Spanish Roman Catholic prelate, archbishop of Vic (1983–2003).
Rita Keane, 86, Irish traditional singer.
A. K. Lohithadas, 54, Indian screenwriter and film director, heart attack.
Billy Mays, 50, American pitchman and television host (Pitchmen), hypertensive heart disease.
Jeff Swanagan, 51, American founding executive director and president of the Georgia Aquarium, heart attack.
Fred Travalena, 66, American comedian and impressionist, non-Hodgkin lymphoma.
Lucia Lauria Vigna, 113, Italian supercentenarian, oldest person in Europe.
Tom Wilkes, 69, American graphic designer.
*Yu Hyun-mok, 83, South Korean film director, cerebral infarction.

29
Dave Batters, 39, Canadian politician, MP for Palliser (2004–2008), suicide.
Joe Bowman, 84, American bootmaker and sharpshooter, heart attack.
Mohammad Hoqouqi, 72, Iranian poet, cirrhosis.
Pauline Picard, 62, Canadian politician, MP for Drummond (1993–2008), lung cancer.
Jan Rubeš, 89, Czech-born Canadian actor (Witness) and opera singer, stroke.
Sandra Warfield, 88, American operatic mezzo-soprano, complications from a stroke.

30
Pina Bausch, 68, German modern dance choreographer, cancer.
Paquito Cordero, 77, Puerto Rican actor, comedian and producer, respiratory disease.
Robert DePugh, 86, American anti-Communist activist.
Liam Fairhurst, 14, British fundraiser, synovial sarcoma.
James F. McNulty, Jr., 83, American politician, U.S. Representative from Arizona (1983–1985), Parkinson's disease.
Jan Molander, 89, Swedish actor and film director.
Luis Oliva, 101, Argentine Olympic athlete.
Harve Presnell, 75, American actor (Fargo, Saving Private Ryan, Patch Adams) and singer, pancreatic cancer.
Shi Pei Pu, 70, Chinese opera singer, gender-bending spy who was basis for M. Butterfly.

References

2009-06
 06